Turbine Fuel Low Volatility JP-7, commonly known as JP-7 (referred to as Jet Propellant 7 prior to MIL-DTL-38219) is a specialized type of jet fuel  developed in 1955 for the United States Air Force (USAF) for use in its supersonic military aircraft, including the SR-71 Blackbird and the Boeing X-51 Waverider.

Usage
JP-7 was developed for the Pratt & Whitney J58 (JT11D-20) turbojet engine, which was used primarily in the now retired Lockheed SR-71 Blackbird. During flight, the SR-71 could attain speeds in excess of Mach 3+, which was the most efficient cruising speed for the J58 engines. However, very high skin temperatures are generated at this speed due to the rapid compression of the air along leading edges. A new jet fuel was needed that was not affected by the heat, so JP-7 jet fuel, with a high flash point and high thermal stability, was developed for this purpose.

As with the SR-71, the X-51A design super-cools this fuel (cooled by extended subsonic flight in the stratosphere; prior to acceleration to supersonic speeds); then, when in supersonic flight, the fuel is heated by its circulation through heat exchangers which transfer to it the heat load of the interior spaces of the airframe. The fuel is then pumped through rotating mechanical parts of the engines and auxiliary mechanical equipment, providing both lubrication and cooling.

History

Shell Oil developed JP-7 in 1955.  Company vice president Jimmy Doolittle arranged for Shell to develop the fuel for the Central Intelligence Agency (CIA) and United States Air Force's (USAF) secret Lockheed U-2 spy plane, which needed a low-volatility fuel that would not evaporate at high altitude.  Manufacturing several hundred thousand gallons (about some 1 million liters) of the new fuel required the petroleum byproducts Shell normally used to make its FLIT insecticide, causing a nationwide shortage of that product that year.

Composition
JP-7 is a compound mixture composed primarily of hydrocarbons; including alkanes, cycloalkanes, alkylbenzenes, indanes/tetralins, and naphthalenes; with addition of fluorocarbons to increase its lubricant properties, an oxidizing agent to make it burn more efficiently, and a caesium-containing compound known as A-50, which is to aid in disguising the radar and infrared signatures of the exhaust plume.

JP-7 is unusual in that it is not a conventional distillate fuel, but is created from special blending stocks in order to have very low (<3%) concentration of highly volatile components like benzene or toluene, and almost no sulfur, oxygen, and nitrogen impurities. It has a low vapor pressure, and high thermal oxidation stability. The fuel must operate across a wide range of temperatures: from near freezing at high altitude, to the high temperatures of the airframe and engine parts that are being cooled by it at high speed.  Its volatility must be low enough to make it flash-resistant at these high temperatures.

The very low volatility, and relative unwillingness of JP-7 to be ignited, required triethylborane (TEB) to be injected into the engine in order to initiate combustion, and allow afterburner operation in flight.  The SR-71 had a limited capacity for TEB, and therefore had a limited number of available 'shots' of TEB (usually 16) for restarts, and those had to be managed carefully on long-duration flights with multiple stages of relatively low-altitude air refueling and normal high-altitude cruise flight.

Properties
Melting point: 
Boiling point at : 
Density at : 779–806 kg/m3
Vapor pressure at :  (20.7 kPa)
Flashpoint: 
Net heat of combustion:  min.

See also

JP-1
JP-4
JP-5
JP-6
JP-8
JPTS
Aviation fuel
KC-135Q

References
Notes

References

Bibliography

 Rich, Ben R. and Leo Janos. Skunk Works: A Personal Memoir of My Years at Lockheed. New York: Little, Brown and Company, 1994. .
 Faroon, Obaid; Mandell, Diane; Navarro, Hernan. Toxicological Profile for Jet Fuels JP-4 and JP-7. Agency for Toxic Substances and Disease Registry, Atlanta, June 1995. 

Aviation fuels
Shell plc
1955 introductions